Brian William Eric Rushton (born 21 October 1943) is an English former professional footballer who played in the Football League for Birmingham City and Notts County. He played as a full back.

Rushton was born in Sedgley, Staffordshire. He captained the Brierley Hill schools representative side before joining Birmingham City as an amateur in 1959. He made his debut in the First Division on 30 March 1963, deputising for Stan Lynn in a home game against Sheffield Wednesday which resulted in a 1–1 draw; this was the first of a run of eleven games, nine in the league and both legs of the League Cup semi-final, which ended when Lynn regained fitness. He played three more first-team games before joining Fourth Division club Notts County in 1967, but after one season, in which he played only three games, Rushton dropped into non-league football with Stourbridge.

References

1943 births
Living people
People from Sedgley
English footballers
Association football fullbacks
Birmingham City F.C. players
Notts County F.C. players
Stourbridge F.C. players
English Football League players